Danga  is a Bangladeshi Bengali-language action drama film written and directed by Kazi Hayat.
It stars Manna, Suchorita, Wasimul Bari Rajib, Anowara and Mizu Ahmed in lead roles. The film was released in 1991. 

Danga film won two National Film Awards. Wasimul Bari Rajib won the Best Supporting Actor Awards and popular Singer Sabina Yasmin won Best Female Singer Awards for song "Hey Matribhumi".

Plot
Begunbari, a small town where Abul Hossain is an influential parliament member who embezzles all the relief goods with the help of local chairman. Chhobi is a lower middle class young woman goes to get relief goods. Chairman's evil eye fell on her and VP of local college Habib saves her. As a result, he gets murdered. OC Raju comes to the town to investigate the murder and reveal the actual culprit behind this.

Cast
 Manna as OC Raju
 Suchorita as Chhobi
 Wasimul Bari Rajib as Kalu Miah
 Mizu Ahmed as MP Abul Hossain
 Anowara as Amena Begum
 Dildar as SI Abdur Rahman
 Siraj Haider as Advocate 2
 Kabila as Kalu's Gung
 Kazi Maruf as Maruf
 Shapna as Shapna
 Azharul Islam Khan as Police Commissioner

Music
Danga film music Composed by Ahmed Imtiaz Bulbul lyricist by Ahmed Imtiaz Bulbul and Mohammad Rafikuzzaman and playback by Andrew Kishore, Runa Laila, Baby Naznin, Rabindra Nath Roy, Shakila Zafar and Sabina Yasmin.

"He Matribhumi" - Sabina Yasmin 
"Ami Ek Jhora Koli" - Sabina Yasmin 
"Je Jon Premer Bhab Jane Na" - Runa Laila

Award and achievements
The film won two National Film Awards:
 Winner Best Actor in a Supporting Role, Wasimul Bari Rajib
 Winner Best Female Playback Singer, Sabina Yasmin

References

External links
 

Bengali-language Bangladeshi films
Bangladeshi drama films
1991 films
Films scored by Ahmed Imtiaz Bulbul
Films directed by Kazi Hayat
1990s Bengali-language films
1991 drama films